Adyaagiin Jügdernamjil (born 20 August 1952) is a Mongolian weightlifter. He competed in the 1980 Summer Olympics.

References

1952 births
Living people
Weightlifters at the 1980 Summer Olympics
Mongolian male weightlifters
Olympic weightlifters of Mongolia
20th-century Mongolian people